West Virginia Route 28 is a north–south route through the Potomac Highlands of the U.S. state of West Virginia. The southern terminus of the route is at West Virginia Route 39 in Huntersville. The northern terminus is at the Maryland state line in Wiley Ford, where the route continues into Cumberland as Canal Parkway upon crossing the North Branch Potomac River.

Attractions
National Radio Astronomy Observatory
Seneca Rocks National Recreation Area
Fort Ashby
Greater Cumberland Regional Airport
Mineral County Fair
North Fork Mountain

Historic sites
Old Pine Church, Purgitsville
Sloan–Parker House, Junction
The Burg, Mechanicsburg
Indian Mound Cemetery, Romney
Davis History House, Romney
Literary Hall, Romney
Washington Place, Romney
Wappocomo farm & Train Station, Romney
Fort Forman site, Vance
The Rocks, Wappocomo
Hanging Rocks, Wappocomo
Shouse-Martin House, Springfield
Fort Ashby, Fort Ashby
Fort Sellers, near Short Gap

Major intersections

WV 28 Alternate

West Virginia Route 28 Alternate is a north–south alternate route of West Virginia Route 28 around Wiley Ford in northern West Virginia. The southern terminus of the route is at WV 28 in Wiley Ford. The northern terminus is at the Maryland state line in Ridgeley, where the road continues into Cumberland as MD 942 (Bridge Street) after crossing the North Branch Potomac River. The road passes by Fort Ohio in Ridgeley.

See also
 Moorefield and North Branch Turnpike

References

External links

028
West Virginia Route 028
West Virginia Route 028
West Virginia Route 028
West Virginia Route 028
West Virginia Route 028
West Virginia Route 028